Fusitriton brasiliensis is a species of predatory sea snail, a marine gastropod mollusk in the family Cymatiidae.

Distribution

Description 
The maximum recorded shell length is 123 mm.

Habitat 
Minimum recorded depth is 1200 m. Maximum recorded depth is 1200 m.

References

Cymatiidae
Gastropods described in 2003